Obscurin-like protein 1 is a protein that in humans is encoded by the OBSL1 gene.

References

Further reading

External links
  GeneReviews/NIH/NCBI/UW entry on 3-M syndrome
  OMIM entries on 3-M syndrome
 PDBe-KB provides an overview of all the structure information available in the PDB for Human Obscurin-like protein 1 (OBSL1)